Dead Man Walkin is a compilation album released by Death Row Records on October 31, 2000, composed of archived Snoop Dogg recordings. The album was not authorized by Snoop Dogg, nor recognized on the discography on his website. Snoop Dogg was an artist on Death Row from 1992 to 1998, when he left the label following labelmate Dr. Dre's departure and the death of Tupac Shakur. The split between Snoop Dogg and Death Row head Suge Knight was less than amicable, and the title of this release was an unfriendly warning from Knight to Snoop Dogg, who had spoken out against the imposing Knight in several interviews and on record as well. Despite Dead Man Walkin not being authorized by Snoop Dogg, he now owns the rights to the album due to his acquisition of Death Row Records in 2022.

Music
According to SoundScan (2005), Dead Man Walkin''' has sold 220,478 copies. A music video was released for "Head Doctor". The song, "Change Gone Come" which features vocals from Val Young first appeared on the 1998 Snoop Dogg compilation album, SmokeFest World Tour. The song also appeared on the 1999 compilation album, Well Connected'', from Swerve Records.

Track listing

Chart performance

Sales

References

External links

G-funk albums
2000 compilation albums
Albums produced by DJ Pooh
Albums produced by Soopafly
Albums produced by Cold 187um
Snoop Dogg compilation albums
Albums produced by L.T. Hutton
Gangsta rap compilation albums
Albums produced by Daz Dillinger
Death Row Records compilation albums